State Road 201 in the U.S. state of Indiana exists in Wells County. It meets State Road 124 just east of Bluffton.

Route description
SR 201 begins at the entrance to Ouabache State Park. It heads northwest until it reaches a four-way intersection with two local roads. The road heads north from here until it terminates at a 3-way intersection with SR 124. SR 201 is an undivided two-lane road for its entire length.

Major intersections

See also

Indiana State Road 1
Indiana State Road 101
Indiana State Road 301

References

External links

201
Transportation in Wells County, Indiana